Kampala Capital City Authority (KCCA) is the legal entity, established by the Ugandan Parliament, that is responsible for the operations of the capital city of Kampala in Uganda. It replaced the Kampala City Council (KCC).

Location
The headquarters of KCCA are located on Nakasero Hill in the central business district of Kampala. The headquarters are immediately south-west of the Uganda Parliament Building. The main entrance to the KCCA Complex is located on Kimathi Avenue, which comes off of Parliament Avenue. The coordinates of this building are 0° 18' 54.00"N, 32° 35' 9.00"E (Latitude:0.315000; Longitude:32.585832).

Overview
The affairs of the capital city of Kampala were brought under the direct supervision of the central Ugandan government. The city clerk, formerly the highest financial officer in the city, was replaced by the executive director, who is answerable to the Minister of Kampala Capital City Authority, currently Hajat Minsa Kabanda. The elected mayor became the lord mayor, now a largely ceremonial position. In addition to the politically elected councilors, the expanded KCCA Council has members from the following professional bodies as full voting members: Uganda Institute of Professional Engineers, Uganda Society of Architects, Uganda Medical and Dental Practitioners Council, and Uganda Law Society.

Current leaders
As of June 2021, the key officials responsible for KCCA affairs were:

 Hon. Hajjat Minsa Kabanda, Cabinet Minister of Kampala Capital City Authority, since 3 August 2021
 Hon. Kyofatogabye Kabuye, Minister of State for Kampala Capital City Authority, since 3 August 2021
 Erias Lukwago, the Lord Mayor of Kampala since 2011 
 Doreen Nyanjura, Deputy Lord Mayor, since June 2021. 
 Zahrah Maala Luyirika, Authority Council Speaker, Since June 2021
Nasur Masaba, Deputy Authority Speaker, Since June 2021
 Dorothy Kisaka, the executive director of Kampala Capital City Authority since June 2020 
 David Luyimbazi Ssali, the deputy executive director of Kampala Capital City Authority, since June 2020.

Administrative divisions

Kampala is divided into five divisions, each headed by a popularly elected mayor. Those divisions are preserved under the new KCCA Law. It is not yet clear what the roles of those five mayors will be in relation to the Lord Mayor and the KCCA Executive Director.

Staff
As of February 2019, KCCA employed 1,113 staff, of whom 391 were permanent employees appointed by the public service commission.

Recent developments
In February 2015, Rift Valley Railways, in collaboration with KCCA, began testing commuter passenger railway service in Kampala and its suburbs, with a view to establish regular scheduled service beginning in March 2015. Uganda and China have signed a memorandum of understanding to establish an elevated  light rail network.

See also
 Kampala District
 Kampala Capital City Authority FC

References

External links
 Website of Kampala Capital City Authority
KCCA Beyond the Basics
 Get Government Offices Out of City Centre - Musisi
Japan to lend Uganda Shs559 Billion for flyovers

 
Organisations based in Kampala